Society for the Protection of Unborn Children is an anti-abortion organisation in the United Kingdom which also opposes assisted suicide and abortifacient birth control.

History and support 
SPUC was formed in 1966 amid parliamentary debates over the Abortion Act, which came into law one year later. Although it is not officially faith-based, SPUC and the more conservative anti-abortion charity Life mainly draw upon Catholic and evangelical Protestant support.

Between 2020 and 2022 the group received over £72,000 from US donors who used an agency to disguise their identity.

Resignation of Bowman
SPUC founder Phyllis Bowman resigned from her post in July 1999, with nearly half of the 12-person national executive resigning in sympathy. This was believed to be because of a rift with SPUC national director John Smeaton over the organisation's strategies.

The Pro-Life All-Party Parliamentary Group, headed by the then-Shadow Home Secretary, Ann Widdecombe, met with SPUC to discuss concerns that following Bowman's resignation, the organisation may divert resources from the political arena and seek greater realignment with the Catholic Church, alienating Protestant, Muslim and atheist supporters of SPUC.

Tony Nicklinson right-to-die case
SPUC opposed locked-in syndrome sufferer Tony Nicklinson's legal battle for a right to assisted death.

Marriage
SPUC has opposed same-sex marriage.

On 18 June 2019, the media reported that the organisation did a leaflet drop in Sneinton, Nottingham alongside a letter for parents asking for their child to be withdrawn from Relationships and Sex Education (RSE) lessons.  This backfired as some residents in the area condemned the action and, in an interview on BBC Radio Nottingham, the leader of Nottingham City Council confirmed that no letters had been handed in at any school.

References

External links
Society for the Protection of Unborn Children, UK

Anti-abortion organisations in the United Kingdom
1970 establishments in the United Kingdom
Organizations established in 1970